Álvaro Juliano Ongilio (born 6 June 1991), sometimes known as just Álvaro, is a Brazilian footballer who plays as midfielder for Italian  club Paganese.

Career
On 6 June 2017, Álvaro Juliano signed a two-year contract with Bulgarian club Botev Plovdiv. On 6 July Álvaro made an official debut during the 1-0 win over Partizani Tirana in the 1st qualifying round of UEFA Europa League.

Álvaro Juliano scored his first goal for Botev Plovdiv on 21 September with a spectacular long shot during the 1-3 away victory in the 1/16 final of the Bulgarian Cup against Lokomotiv Gorna Oryahovitsa.

On 7 August 2018, he signed a one-year contract with Catanzaro.

On 1 July 2019 he joined Potenza on a 2-year contract. On 31 January 2020 he returned on loan to Catanzaro until 30 June 2020. On 1 February 2021 he was loaned to Monopoli. On 28 August 2021, his contract with Potenza was terminated by mutual consent.

On 2 November 2021, he signed with Viterbese.

On 5 August 2022, Juliano moved to Paganese in Serie D.

Career statistics

Club

Honours

Club
Botev Plovdiv
 Bulgarian Supercup: 2017

References

External links 

1991 births
Living people
People from Ribeirão Preto
Brazilian footballers
Association football midfielders
Campeonato Brasileiro Série D players
Botafogo Futebol Clube (SP) players
Clube Recreativo e Atlético Catalano players
Associação Atlética Caldense players
Olímpia Futebol Clube players
First Professional Football League (Bulgaria) players
Botev Plovdiv players
Serie C players
Serie D players
U.S. Catanzaro 1929 players
Potenza Calcio players
S.S. Monopoli 1966 players
U.S. Viterbese 1908 players
Paganese Calcio 1926 players
Brazilian expatriate footballers
Brazilian expatriate sportspeople in Bulgaria
Brazilian expatriate sportspeople in Italy
Expatriate footballers in Bulgaria
Expatriate footballers in Italy
Footballers from São Paulo (state)